In Pursuit of the 13th Note is the debut album by United Kingdom acid jazz group Galliano. It was released on Gilles Peterson's Talkin' Loud record label on 25 March 1991. Although a studio album, the performances were recorded live.

Track listing

Release history

References

1991 debut albums
Galliano (band) albums
Talkin' Loud albums